is a Noh play from the fifteenth century, concerned with the childhood experiences of the samurai hero Minamoto no Yoshitsune.

Plot 
The play begins with a cherry blossom viewing expedition involving monks and children from Kurama temple. On being joined by a rough Yamabushi - an ascetic mountain priest - the party leaves in protest, with the exception of one child, who reveals himself as the young Yoshitsune, isolated at the temple both as an orphaned son and as the only child from the (eclipsed) Genji clan.  The stranger reveals himself in turn as the head Tengu, or long-nosed goblin; and he proceeds to instruct the young hero in the martial arts, with a view to him avenging his slaughtered father's death.

Characteristics
The play is notable for the large cast of child actors, and for the range of actions - chanting; acting; swordplay - which they undertake.

Critics have seen elements of homoeroticism in the relationship between the (phallicized) Yamabushi and the child actors.

Influence
Gekkei painted 'Young Bull and the Goblins', based on the play, and including an associated haiku by Kikaku: 
"First cherry blossoms - 
Let me show you a letter
That the goblins wrote".

See also

Eboshi-ori
Sōjōbō
Zeami Motokiyo

References

External links 
 Kurama-tengu: photostory

Noh
Noh plays
Works about tengu